John Ravenscroft may refer to:

 John Ravenscroft (engineer), engineer and engine designer for British manufacturer TVR
 John Ravenscroft (horticulturalist), British founder of Bridgemere Garden World
 John Ravenscroft (composer) (c. 1665 – 1697), English violinist and composer
 John Robert Parker Ravenscroft, English radio broadcaster known as John Peel
 John Stark Ravenscroft (1772–1830), American bishop of the Episcopal Church